Federico Acuña may refer to:

 Federico Acuña (footballer) (born 1985), Paraguayan footballer
 Federico Acuña (politician), Paraguayan politician